Tilly van der Zwaard (18 January 1938 – 6 February 2019) was a middle distance runner from the Netherlands. At the 1962 European Athletics Championships in Belgrade she won a bronze medal in the 400 m event, behind Maria Itkina of the Soviet Union and Joy Grieveson of Great Britain.

Van der Zwaard twice represented her native country in the 400 m event at the Summer Olympics, in 1964 and 1968. Her best achievement was sixth place in 1964.
 

She was born Mathilda Catrina van der Zwaard in Leiden, Netherlands. On 25 November 1964 she married Ger van der Made and changed her name to van der Made-van der Zwaard. After their divorce, she dropped van der Made from her name. She moved to the United States after retiring from athletics and died February 2019 in Edgewater, Florida.

References

External links

 
 

1938 births
2019 deaths
Athletes (track and field) at the 1964 Summer Olympics
Athletes (track and field) at the 1968 Summer Olympics
Dutch female sprinters
European Athletics Championships medalists
Olympic athletes of the Netherlands
Sportspeople from Leiden